This is a list of Norwegian television series produced and broadcast in Norway.

References 

Norway
 
Series